The  Maryland Commandos season was the second season for the Commandos. They finished with a record of 0–4.

Regular season

Schedule

Standings

y – clinched regular-season title

x – clinched playoff spot

Roster

All-Arena team members

Maryland Commandos
Maryland Commandos
Washington Commandos seasons